The Trench Cup is the second tier Gaelic football championship trophy for Third Level Education Colleges, Institutes of Technology and Universities in Ireland and England (first tier is the Sigerson Cup and third tier is Corn na Mac Léinn). The Trench Cup Championship is administered by Comhairle Ard Oideachais, the Gaelic Athletic Association's Higher Education Council.

History
In 1975 moves were made by non-university colleges to set-up their own knock-out Gaelic Football Championship tournament as a consequence of being shut out of the Sigerson Cup Championship. The initiative came from St. Joseph's Training College, Belfast. The concept of the Trench Cup was proposed by Pat Blake, Comhairle Ard Oideachais Chairman (1978–1983), and Peter McGinnity (later a Fermanagh All-Star) as a knock-out competition for all higher education colleges not in the Sigerson Cup tournament. Pat Blake purchased a trophy costing £80 sterling at Tommy Lennon's Jewellers, Smithfield Market, Belfast. The trophy was named 'The Trench Cup' after Trench House, St Joseph's Training College, Belfast.

The competition first came into existence in the 1975/76 season. The inaugural final was played between St Joseph's T.C., Belfast and the National College of Physical Education, Limerick at Croke Park. NCPE became the inaugural champions. In the 1980s the Sigerson championship was opened up to allow an increasing number of Universities, Regional Technical Colleges and Institutes of Higher Education to participate on the basis of their league success. Subsequently, the Trench Cup became the second tier competition for the third-level institutions which were not in the Sigerson championship.

Dundalk Institute of Technology are the current Trench Cup champions, after defeating Waterford IT on a scoreline of 1-14 to 1-08 at University Ulster on 20 February 2016.  This was the Colleges first win. Both Coláiste Phádraig and Sligo IT share the record number of Trench Cup wins, standing at five, while  Garda College have 3 wins. The highest winning margin ever is that of Thomond College, Limerick over Sligo RTC of 16 points in 1977, while the largest margin in the 21st century is that of Trinity College Dublin over Hope University, Liverpool of 10 points in 2012.

The joint highest individual points scorers in any Trench Cup final are D. Duggan of Garda College in 1993 [1-07, 10 points] and Seán O'Sullivan of Limerick IT in 1999 [2-06, 10 points]. The championship is currently sponsored by the Electric Ireland.  The Trench Cup was previously sponsored by Independent.ie [2014-2017], Irish Daily Mail [2012-2013], Ulster Bank [2007-2011], Datapac [2003-2006] and Bus Éireann [1998-2002].

Roll of honour

Wins listed by College

Finalists who have not won the Trench Cup:
 Liverpool Hope University
 Liverpool John Moore's University
 Magee College, Derry (now UU Magee)

Winners listed by year

 1975/76 National College of Physical Education
 1976/77 Thomond College
 1977/78 St Joseph's Training College
 1978/79 Cork RTC
 1979/80 Northern Ireland Polytechnic
 1980/81 Sligo RTC
 1981/82 Thomond College
 1982/83 Northern Ireland Polytechnic
 1983/84 NIHE Limerick
 1984/85 Sligo RTC
 1985/86 Sligo RTC
 1986/87 Dublin IT
 1987/88 Thomond College
 1988/89 Galway RTC
 1989/90 Sligo RTC
 1990/91 Sligo RTC
 1991/92 Athone RTC
 1992/93 Garda College
 1993/94 Garda College
 1994/95 Dublin IT
 1995/96 Galway RTC
 1996/97 Dublin IT
 1997/98 UU Coleraine
 1998/99 Limerick IT
 1999/00 Army Cadet College
 2000/01 IT Tallaght
 2001/02 Coláiste Phádraig, Droim Conrach
 2002/03 IT Tallaght
 2003/04 St Mary's College Strawberry Hill
 2004/05 Letterkenny IT
 2005/06 Trinity College Dublin
 2006/07 Coláiste Phádraig, Droim Conrach
 2007/08 Mary Immaculate College
 2008/09 Coláiste Phádraig, Droim Conrach
 2009/10 IT Tralee
 2010/11 Coláiste Phádraig, Droim Conrach
 2011/12 Trinity College Dublin
 2012/13 Blanchardstown IT
 2013/14 Coláiste Phádraig, Droim Conrach
 2014/15 Garda College
 2015/16 Dundalk Institute of Technology (DkIT)
 2016/17 Dundalk Institute of Technology (DkIT)
 2017/18 Mary Immaculate College Limerick
 2018/19 Letterkenny Institute of Technology
 2019/20 Cork Institute of Technology
 2020/21 Not Held due to Covid-19 Pandemic
 2021/22 Galway-Mayo Institute of Technology (GMIT)

Winning captains listed by year

Man of the Match awardees listed by year
The accolade of Man of the Match or Tournament is a recent innovation (1998). In the case of the early years of the Trench Cup, the highest scoring member of the team is designated.

Finals listed by year

References

1976 establishments in Ireland
Gaelic football competitions at Irish universities
Gaelic football cup competitions